Rolf Harry Degerlund (born 8 December 1952 in Gunnarsbyn, Boden Municipality, Sweden) is a Swedish actor. Rolf is married to Kerstin Degerlund, Graphic designer. Rolf is the Theatre Director for the Sami National Theatre in Norway since 2016.

After studying at Kalix folkhögskola, Degerlund studied at Marcel Marceau's theatre school in Ireland and at Josef Szajna's studio theatre in Warszawa. In 1975 Degerlund worked for the TV theatre in Gothenburg and 1978 for TV in Sundsvall. In 1978 he was engaged as actor at Norrbottensteatern where he was theatre chief 1988–2001.

In 2002 Degerlund founded the Ice Globe Theatre in Jukkasjärvi, a theatre which is a copy of Shakespeare's Globe, except that it's built of ice and snow, and in 2004 he received the Innovation Award in London for his "innovative" theatre.

Selected filmography
2009 - Luftslottet som sprängdes
2008 - Varg
2003 - Emma och Daniel: Mötet
2002 - Grabben i graven bredvid
1997 - Vildängel
1997 - Kalle Blomkvist och Rasmus
1996 - Jägarna
1991 - Barnens Detektivbyrå (TV)
1989 - Tre kärlekar (TV)

References

External links

Swedish Film Database
dn.se

Swedish male actors
1952 births
Living people
People from Boden Municipality